National Tertiary Route 927, or just Route 927 (or ) is a National Road Route of Costa Rica, located in the Guanacaste province.

Description
In Guanacaste province the route covers Cañas canton (Palmira district), Tilarán canton (Santa Rosa, Tierras Morenas districts).

References

Highways in Costa Rica